Luper Cemetery is near Eugene, Oregon, and is one of the earliest pioneer cemeteries in the southern Willamette Valley.  The site is also known as Irving Cemetery or Baker Cemetery. The first grave site was in 1857, although records indicate that the cemetery began in 1859, when land was donated by Thomas and Elizabeth Baker.

The cemetery is named for James Luper, an 1852 pioneer from Illinois, who settled nearby in an area known for a time as Luper, Oregon. James Luper owned the land surrounding the cemetery. Find a Grave has identified 160 graves, many of pioneer families.

References 

Junction City, Oregon
Cemeteries in Oregon
1859 establishments in Oregon